Seveux-Motey is a commune in the Haute-Saône department in the region of Bourgogne-Franche-Comté in eastern France. It was established on 1 January 2019 by merger of the former communes of Seveux (the seat) and Motey-sur-Saône.

See also
Communes of the Haute-Saône department

References

Communes of Haute-Saône
Populated places established in 2019
2019 establishments in France